The 2012 Prosperita Open was a professional tennis tournament played on clay courts. It was the ninth edition of the tournament which was part of the 2012 ATP Challenger Tour. It took place in Ostrava Czech Republic between April 30 and May 6, 2012

ATP entrants

Seeds

 1 Rankings are as of April 23, 2012.

Other entrants
The following players received wildcards into the singles main draw:
  Jakub Lustyk
  Grzegorz Panfil
  Adam Pavlásek
  Jiří Veselý

The following players received entry from the qualifying draw:
  Andrej Martin
  Marek Michalička
  Maximilian Neuchrist
  Grega Žemlja

Champions

Singles

 Jonathan Dasnières de Veigy def.  Jan Hájek, 7–5, 6–2

Doubles

 Radu Albot /  Teymuraz Gabashvili def.  Adam Pavlásek /  Jiří Veselý, 7–5, 5–7, [10–8]

External links
Official Website

Prosperita Open
Prosperita Open
Prosperita Open
Prosperita Open
Prosperita Open